South-Eastern Metropolitan Region is one of the eight electoral regions of Victoria, Australia, which elects five members to the Victorian Legislative Council (also referred to as the upper house) by proportional representation. The region was created in 2006 following the 2005 reform of the Victorian Legislative Council.

The region covers the outer south eastern suburbs of Melbourne, and comprises the Legislative Assembly districts of Berwick, Carrum, Clarinda, Cranbourne, Dandenong, Frankston, Mordialloc, Mulgrave, Narre Warren North, Narre Warren South and Rowville.

Members

Returned MLCs by seat
Seats are allocated by single transferable vote using group voting tickets. Changes in party membership between elections have been omitted for simplicity.

Election results

References

External links
 South Eastern Metropolitan Region Profile, Victorian Electoral Commission

Electoral regions of Victoria (Australia)
Electoral districts and divisions of Greater Melbourne